Pedro Jacinto Elá Eyene (born 2 May 1982), known as Elá, is an Equatoguinean retired footballer who played as a right winger.

Club career
Born in Añisoc, Elá moved to Barcelona at the age of ten with his parents. He played most of his youth football with RCD Espanyol (five years), being selected to Spain's youth teams whilst with the club and also helping the reserves promote to Segunda División B in 2000; the following year, he won the Copa del Rey Juvenil with the juniors.

On 24 July 1999, Elá made his competitive debut with Espanyol's first team, appearing in a UEFA Intertoto Cup game against Montpellier HSC in France, as a 70th-minute substitute (1–2 loss). It was his only appearance for the Catalans.

In the 2001 off-season, Elá signed for Southampton in England, penning a three-year contract after turning down Coventry City. During his spell he never appeared officially with the Premier League side, being limited to reserve team football; additionally, in the 2001–02 season, he suffered a serious knee injury.

In 2002, Elá was loaned to Hércules CF in the Spanish third level, under former Sporting de Gijón and CD Tenerife player Felipe Miñambres. In March 2003, in a friendly match with Elche CF, he suffered another severe injury to his knee, after a hard tackle by Raúl Pérez; upon his return to the Saints, he continued to appear exclusively for the second team.

In August 2005, Elá signed for Dundee of the Scottish Football League First Division. His output consisted of two league matches, plus two appearances in the Challenge Cup and one in the League Cup, going scoreless in the process; he left the club in late November.

From 2005 until his retirement in 2010 at the age of only 28, Elá played exclusively in amateur football, the sole exception being eight third level games for UDA Gramenet in the 2006–07 campaign.

Post-retirement / Personal life
After retiring, Elá returned to Barcelona and started his own clothing line, Malabona (a combination of "Malabo" and "Barcelona"), working alongside his wife Esther in the design of T-shirts and all kinds of fashion clothes, which were then sold via the internet.

His younger brother, Ruslan, was also a footballer. A defender, he represented the Equatoguinean national team.

References

External links

Personal blog 

1982 births
Living people
People from Añisoc
Equatoguinean emigrants to Spain
Naturalised citizens of Spain
Spanish footballers
Equatoguinean footballers
Association football wingers
Segunda División B players
Tercera División players
RCD Espanyol B footballers
RCD Espanyol footballers
Hércules CF players
Deportivo Alavés B players
CF Gavà players
UDA Gramenet footballers
CE Premià players
Southampton F.C. players
Scottish Football League players
Dundee F.C. players
Spain youth international footballers
Equatoguinean expatriate footballers
Expatriate footballers in England
Expatriate footballers in Scotland
Equatoguinean expatriate sportspeople in England
Equatoguinean expatriate sportspeople in Scotland